Didier Berthod (born 1981, in Bramois, Valais), is a Swiss rock climber and priest. He specializes in traditional climbing, and crack climbing in particular.

Climbing career
Berthod made trips to the America where he put up new traditional climbing routes such as Learning to Fly and From Switzerland wit Love, both at grade 5.13+ in Indian Creek in Utah.  

The film also documented Berthod’s other climbs in Europe and his frugal lifestyle such as working in a hostel between attempts.

Religious life
After completing First Ascent, Berthod, then aged 25 and carrying a serious knee injury, decided to completely abandon rock climbing and joined 's Franciscan-community, the  fraternity, in Saint-Maurice, Switzerland (close to where Berthod was born), as a monk.  In 2016, Berthod was ordained as a priest, shortly afterward had started some climbing again.  

In a 2018 documentary on Berthod called Fissure, he explained his reasons for leaving climbing: "I felt like a junkie, someone who craved a daily dose of climbing. If I didn't get it, I got angry. I hated that feeling because it kept me from being truly free. I needed to be free, and that’s what my faith gave me – that and spiritual healing". On his return to climbing, he told German TV: "In recent years I quit this [monastic] way of being Christian and I embraced a way more humanistic way of being Christian". By 2020, Berthod had completed a new  bolted route on Petit Clocher du Portalet.

Filmography
 Documentary featuring Berthod on Cobra Crack in Squamish, British Columbia: 
 Documentary on Berthod:

See also
Dave MacLeod, Scottish traditonal climber
Sonnie Trotter, Canadian traditional climber

References

External links

FISSURE: The story of Didier Berthod, "Alp & Ism" Trento Film Festival (2020)
VIDEO: Didier Berthod, Swiss crack climbing legend, PlanetMountain (2021)

1981 births
Living people
Swiss rock climbers
People from Valais
Swiss priests